Datong–Xi'an high-speed railway or Daxi HSR is a dual-track, electrified, high-speed rail line operated by CR Taiyuan Group and CR Xi'an Group between Datong, Shanxi and Xi'an, Shaanxi. Travel time between the two terminal cities will be reduced from 16.5 hours to about three hours.

Route
The high speed rail line will run down the length of Shanxi Province from Datong in the north through Shuozhou, Xinzhou, the provincial capital Taiyuan, Jinzhong, Linfen and Yuncheng. It crosses the Yellow River at Yongji, enter Shaanxi and reach Xian via Weinan and Lintong. As of 2022, most of the high-speed line is finished, but the section between Huairen East and Yuanping West runs on the -long Hanjialing–Yuanping railway, a line built mainly for freight with a design speed of  that was opened on 29 March 2014 to bypass a section of the Datong–Puzhou railway. In future passenger traffic will run on a section of the new Jining–Datong–Yuanping high-speed railway that has been officially under construction next to the line from Datong South to Yuanping West since June 2020.

The whole line now forms part of the Beijing–Kunming corridor of the 8+8 HSR Grid, now under development. The section between Xi'an and Xinzhou (where the proposed Xiong'an–Xinzhou high-speed railway—Xiongxin HSR—would branch off to Xiong'an) forms part of its main line, while the section between Xinzhou and Datong forms part of the Beijing–Zhangjiakou–Datong–Taiyuan branch.

Together with the Shijiazhuang–Taiyuan high-speed railway, the Taiyuan-Xi'an section of the Datong–Xi'an passenger railway provides a potential more direct route for high-speed passenger trains between Beijing and Xi'an (and points west) than the usual route via Zhengzhou ( via Taiyuan vs. ). However, as of early 2015, this route appears to be slower than the one via Zhengzhou, and does not seem to be used by any direct Beijing-Xi'an trains. Instead, some services run from Beijing via Taiyuan to the southwestern Shanxi (mostly Yuncheng), while others run between Taiyuan and Xi'an.

History
Construction began on 3 December 2009 and was expected to cost ¥96.3 billion. The line was scheduled to be completed by 2013 or 2014. The Taiyuan-Xi'an section of the railway was opened on July 1, 2014; the Taiyuan-Yuanping section was opened on September 28, 2018; and the Datong-Yuanping section is currently not newly constructed but using quadruple tracks of North Tongpu Line between Yuanping West and Huairen East. Such service commenced on May 1, 2019.

Notes

High-speed railway lines in China
Rail transport in Shanxi
Rail transport in Shaanxi